The Jacobs R-830 or L-5 is a seven-cylinder, air-cooled, radial engine for aircraft manufactured in the United States, production started in 1935.

Design and development
The R-830 was effectively an enlargement of the R-755 with strengthened stressed parts. With a bore and stroke of 5.0 in × 5.5 in (140 mm × 127 mm) the displacement was 831 cu in (13.6 L), takeoff power was around 285 hp (212 kW). The engine features steel cylinders with aluminum-alloy cylinder heads.

Applications
 Beechcraft Model 18
 Beechcraft Staggerwing
 Fleet 50
 Fleetwings Sea Bird
 Howard DGA-8
 Waco S Series

Specifications (L-5)

See also

References

Notes

Bibliography

Gunston, Bill. World Encyclopedia of Aero Engines. Cambridge, England. Patrick Stephens Limited, 1989.

External links
The Jacobs Engine - Nanton Lancaster Society

1930s aircraft piston engines
Aircraft air-cooled radial piston engines
Jacobs aircraft engines